In the Canadian Forces, Maritime Forces Atlantic (MARLANT) is responsible for the fleet training and operational readiness of the Royal Canadian Navy in the Atlantic Ocean and Arctic Ocean. It was once referred to as Canadian Atlantic Station.

Structure 
Commander Maritime Forces Atlantic (COMMARLANT) is also the Commander Joint Task Force Atlantic (COMMJTFA), holding the rank of rear admiral.

Reporting to the commander is the commander of Canadian Fleet Atlantic (COMCANFLTLANT), holding the rank of commodore. This officer commands Canadian Fleet Atlantic (CANFLTLANT), and is responsible for the operation and readiness of all warships, auxiliaries and support vessels. COMCANFLTLANT is also the Canadian task group commander for any CANFLTLANT deployment of ships to exercises or operations.

During the 1962 Cuban Missile Crisis:
the operational commander in Halifax, Rear Admiral Kenneth Dyer, was not prepared to take any chances in the nuclear age, and the scope of the Canadian Navy’s actions capture the seriousness of the crisis: ships and aircraft were dispersed with wartime payloads and provisions; secondary headquarters and bases were prepared; vessels in maintenance were rushed to sea; and Bonaventure and its escorts were ordered home from a NATO exercise in the eastern Atlantic. Of the 136 “contact events” made in or near Canada’s WESTLANT (western Atlantic) zonewithout Soviet archival corroboration the number that were actual submarines remains a mysterythere is little doubt that HMCS Kootenay was firmly tracking a Foxtrot off Georges Bank in early November.

Previously the commander of RCN forces in the Atlantic was the flag officer, Atlantic coast, from 1948 Rear Admiral Rollo Mainguy; Roger Bidwell in the 1950s; Rear Admiral Kenneth Dyer in October 1962 during the Cuban Missile Crisis; Commodore Ralph Henessy (August 1963–October 1964) in August 1964 Rear-Admiral Jeffrey Brock (to November 1964); Rear Admiral William Landymore by 1965; (p. 9); Rear Admiral John O'Brien by 1966 (p. 14); thereafter the position may have been amalgamated with commander Maritime Command for several years; Rear Admiral Greg Maddison (1 July 1997, p. 133); Rear Admiral Duncan Miller (in post 1 October 1997, still in post 1 July 1999, p. 150).

Units and facilities
MARLANT headquarters is at CFB Halifax in Halifax, Nova Scotia.

Other facilities include:

 CANFLTLANT HQ (Building D-166)
 Fifth Maritime Operations Group (Building D-165/166)
 Sea Training Atlantic (Building D-166)
 CFAD Bedford
 CFS St. John's
 Fleet Diving Unit Atlantic
 NRS Newport Corner
 NRS Mill Cove
 Shearwater Heliport
 HMC Dockyard
 
 Stadacona
 Stadacona Band of Maritime Forces Atlantic

Prior to Unification the Atlantic Command assignments were:

 
 First Canadian Escort Squadron – assigned WWII-era destroyers
 First Canadian Minesweeping Squadron
 Third Canadian Escort Squadron – assigned WWII-era destroyers
 Special Duties – escort maintenance ship, diving depot ship, gate vessel (A/S boom and training ship), 3 harbour patrol craft
 Fifth Canadian Escort Squadron – assigned post-WWII destroyers 
 Sixth Submarine Squadron – a Royal Navy squadron based in Halifax with 2 WWII-era s to monitor Soviet activity in Caribbean especially during Cuban Missile Crisis. Both boats had been in Canada in the 1950s for brief anti-submarine training.
 Seventh Canadian Escort Squadron – assigned WWII-era frigates
 Ninth Canadian Escort Squadron – assigned WWII-era frigates
 Naval air squadrons
 VF-870 Naval Air Squadron – Banshees assigned to HMCS Bonaventure 
 VS-880 Anti-Submarine Squadron – CS2F1 Tracker A/S patrol
 VU-32 Utility Air Squadron – Silver Star Jet trainers and Grumman Tracker A/S patrol
 HS-50 Helicopter Strike Squadron – Sikorsky Sea King (A/S) and H04S (rescue)
 HU-21 Helicopter Utility Squadron – Bell and Sikorsky Sea King and H04S
 VX-10 Experimental Squadron – Various aircraft for experimental purposes (Grumman Avenger, Beechcraft Expeditor, Fairey Firefly, Bell HTL-4, Hawker Sea Fury, Sikorsky H04S, Grumman Sentinel (AEW), Grumman Tracker, McDonnell Douglas Banshee, Sikorsky Sea King)

MARLANT ships

Frigates

Coastal defence vessels

Arctic offshore patrol vessels

Submarines

See also

 Maritime Forces Pacific

References

External links
 

Atlantic
Atlantic Ocean
Military in the Arctic